Everard Baker (28 July 1913 – 30 March 1987) was an Australian cricketer. He played 24 first-class cricket matches for Victoria between 1936 and 1949.

See also
 List of Victoria first-class cricketers

References

External links
 

1913 births
1987 deaths
Australian cricketers
Victoria cricketers
Cricketers from Melbourne